Sabina de Iturbide y Huarte (30 December 1810 — 15 July 1871) was the daughter of Agustín de Iturbide and Ana María Huarte who received the title of Mexican Princess during the First Mexican Empire by the Constituent Congress.

She was the eldest daughter of Agustín de Iturbide and Ana María de Huarte y Muñiz. She was given the title of Mexican princess when her father was elected as the Mexican Emperor. She given the style of Highness, as the style of Imperial Highness was reserved for only the Prince Imperial of Mexico, the heir apparent to the throne. This position was held by her brother Agustín Jerónimo de Iturbide y Huarte.

Decree 
The Sovereign Mexican Constituent Congress decreed on June 22, 1822 the following:

Art 1 °. The Mexican Monarchy, in addition to being moderate and Constitutional, is also hereditary.
Art 2 °. Consequently, the Nation calls the succession of the Crown for the death of the current Emperor, his firstborn son Don Agustín Jerónimo de Iturbide. The Constitution of the Empire will decide the order of succession of the throne.
Art 3 °. The crown prince will be called "Prince Imperial" and will have the treatment of Imperial Highness.
Art 4 °. The legitimate sons and daughters of H.I.M will be called "Mexican Princes", and will have the treatment of Highness.
Art 5 °. Don José Joaquín de Iturbide y Arreguí, Father of H.I.M, is decorated with the title of "Prince of the Union" and the treatment of Highness, during his life.
Art 6 °. It is also granted the title of "Princess of Iturbide" and the treatment of Highness, during his life, to Doña María Nicolasa de Iturbide y Arámburo, sister of the Emperor.

Ancestry

References 

1810 births
1871 deaths
Sabina
People from Morelia
Daughters of emperors
Nobility of the Americas